Elections to Liverpool City Council were held on Monday 2 November 1908.

After the election, the composition of the council was:

Election result

Note that due to the large number of uncontested seats, these statistics should be taken in context.

Ward results

* - Retiring councillor seeking re-election

Comparisons are made with the 1905 election results, as the retiring councillors were elected in that year.

Abercromby

Aigburth

Anfield

Breckfield

Brunswick

Castle Street

Dingle

Edge Hill

Everton

Exchange

Fairfield

Fazakerley

Garston

Granby

Great George

Kensington

Kirkdale

Low Hill

Netherfield

North Scotland

Old Swan

Prince's Park

Sandhills

St. Anne's

St. Domingo

St. Peter's

Sefton Park East

Sefton Park West

South Scotland

Vauxhall

Walton

Warbreck

Wavertree

Wavertree West

West Derby

Aldermanic elections

Aldermanic election, 9 November 1908

Following the death of Alderman William Hall Jowett (Conservative, elected as an alderman on 9 November 1907), Councillor James Lister (Conservative, Old Swan, elected 1 November 
1907) was elected as an alderman on 9 November 1908.

Aldermanic election, 27 October 1909

The resignation of Alderman William James Burgess (Conservative, elected as an alderman 9 November 
1904)
 was reported to the Council on 6 October 1909.

In his place, Councillor Arthur Crosthwaite (Conservative, Wavertree, elected 1 November 1906) was elected as an alderman by the Council on 27 October 1909.

By-elections

No. 8 Netherfield, 26 November 1908

Caused by the resignation of Councillor George Sturla (Conservative, Netherfield, elected 1 November 1907) which was reported to the Council on 9 November 1908

No. 28A Old Swan, 26 November 1908

Caused by the election of Councillor James Lister (Conservative, Old Swan, elected 1 November 
1907) was elected as an alderman on 9 November 1908.

No.16 Exchange ward, 29 January 1909

Caused by the death of Robert Durning Holt (Liberal, Exchange, elected 1 November 1907) on 10 December 1908.

No.19 St. Peter's, 15 June 1909

The resignation of Councillor Horace Muspratt (Party?, St. Peter's, elected 15 April 1908) was reported to the Council on 2 June 1909.

No. 22 Granby, 7 October 1909

Caused by the death of Councillor Robert Henry Bullen (Liberal, Granby, elected 1 November 1907).

This by-election was notable in that Eleanor Rathbone 
was the first woman elected to Liverpool City Council.

See also

 Liverpool City Council
 Liverpool Town Council elections 1835–1879
 Liverpool City Council elections 1880–present
 Mayors and Lord Mayors of Liverpool 1207–present
 History of local government in England

References

1908
1908 English local elections
1900s in Liverpool